The 1992–93 California Golden Bears men's basketball team represented the University of California, Berkeley as a member of the Pacific-10 Conference during the 1992–93 season.

Led by acting head coach Todd Bozeman, the Bears finished the season with a record of 21–9, and a record of 12–6 in the Pac-10, placing them second. The Bears received an at-large bid to the NCAA tournament where they would make a run to the Sweet Sixteen before falling to Kansas in the Midwest regional semifinals.

Roster

Schedule and results

|-
!colspan=9 style=| Regular season

|-
!colspan=9 style=| NCAA Tournament

Rankings

References

California Golden Bears men's basketball seasons
California
California
California Golden Bear
California Golden Bear